Vitaliy Tyshchenko (born 28 July 1957) is a Soviet Olympic middle-distance runner. He represented his country in the men's 1500 meters at the 1980 Summer Olympics. His time was a 3:44.39 in the first heat, and a 3:41.42 in the semifinals.

References

1957 births
Living people
Soviet male middle-distance runners
Ukrainian male middle-distance runners
Olympic athletes of the Soviet Union
Athletes (track and field) at the 1980 Summer Olympics
Sportspeople from Chernihiv Oblast